This is a list of temples in the Indian state of Tamil Nadu which is famed for Tamil architecture styled Hindu temples, culture and tradition and commonly known as the Land of Temples. Tamil Nadu has more temples than any other states of India. Tamil Nadu is home to more than 40,000 Hindu temples and is aptly called "the land of temples" by media. Many are at least 800 years old and are found scattered all over the state. The rulers of various dynasties constructed these temples over centuries. Vimanas (storeys) and Gopuram (towering gateways to the temple complex) best characterize the temples of Tamil Nadu.

As per Tamil Nadu Hindu Endowments Board, there are 38,615 temples. Most of the largest Hindu temples reside here. Studded with complex architecture, variety of sculptures, and rich inscriptions, the temples remain the very essence of the culture and heritage of Tamil land, with historical records dating back to at least 3,000 years.

The Srirangam temple is the largest temple compound in India and one of the largest religious complexes in the world. Some of these structures have been renovated, expanded and rebuilt over the centuries as a living temple. Srirangam temple is often listed as one of the largest functioning Hindu temple in the world, the still larger Angkor Wat being the largest existing temple. The temple is an active Hindu house of worship and follows the Tenkalai tradition of Sri Vaishnavism. The annual 21-day festival conducted during the Tamil month of Margali (December–January) attracts 1 million visitors. The temple complex has been nominated as a UNESCO World Heritage Site, and is in UNESCO's tentative list. Madurai, Meenakshi Amman Temple has high ‘Gopuram’ towers ornamented with colourful figures. On Pamban Island, Ramanathaswamy Temple is a pilgrimage site. The town of Kanyakumari, at India's southernmost tip, is the site of ritual sunrises.

The state also abounds with temple tanks. The state has 2,359 temple tanks located in 1,586 temples. The government has identified 1,068 tanks for renovation. People from all over the world visits Temples of Tamil Nadu and it is the major Tourist attraction in India.

Temples of Lord Pillaiyar

Temples of Lord Murugan

The Arupadai Veedu

Other major Murugan temples 
Six Abodes of Lord Muruga, the six sacred mountains of Tamil Nadu.

{| class="wikitable" border="0" bgcolor="white"
|-
!S.No
!Name of Temple
!Name of Deity
!Location (Travel Base)
!Built around
!Notes/Beliefs
|-bgcolor=#eeeeee 
| 1
| Kuzhanthai Velappar Temple
| Murugan
| Poombarai (Kodaikanal)
| 1000 CE
| The Kuzhanthai Velappar Temple (Kulandai Velayudha Swami Tirukkovil)[6] has three thousand years of history and was consecrated by Bhogar. The idol is made of Navaphasanam(Dasabashanam) . As per inscriptions in the temple which temple has built by king of Chera dynasty during 10/12 Century.There is a song-poem(Poombarai Velan) by Aruna giri nathar who lived during the 15th century
|-bgcolor=#eeeeee 
| 2
| Sri Navaneethaswara Swamy Temple
| Singaravelavar
| Sikkal (Tanjavur)
|  - 
| Lord Murugan received his weapon, the Velayudham, from his mother Parvathi and used it to perform the Surasamharam at Tiruchendur.
|-bgcolor=#eeeeee
| 3
| Marudamalai Subramanya Swamy Temple
| Dandayudhapani Swamy
| Marudamalai (Coimbatore)
| 1200 CE
| It's here that The Devas approach Lord Murugan to seek his help in destroying Surapadman.
|-bgcolor=#eeeeee
| 4
| Kumarakkottam Subramanya Swamy Temple
| Brahmasaastha
| Kumarakkottam (Kanchipuram)
|  - 
| Kachiappa Sivachariar wrote the sacred Kanda Puraanam at this temple. Also, Lord Murugan assumed the role of the Creator here, after imprisoning Lord Brahma for his ignorance of the meaning of the Pranava manthiram.
|-bgcolor=#eeeeee
| 5
|Valliyur Subramanya Swamy Temple
| Aanantha Kalyana Subramanyar thirumalai kovil, shencottai
| Valliyur (Tirunelveli)
|  - 
| The Subramanyar Temple at Valliyur in Tirunelveli District is a rock-cut sanctum carved out of a hill. The Saravanappoigai in this temple was created by Lord Murugan at the request of Valli, his consort.
|-bgcolor=#eeeeee
| 6
| Vallakkottai Murugan Temple
| Kodaiyandavar
| Vallakkottai (Chennai)
|  - 
| The Murugan idol in this temple is the tallest in Tamil Nadu, at 7 ft.
|-bgcolor=#eeeeee
| 7
| Kanda Swamy Temple
| Kanda Swamy
| Tirupporur (Chennai)
| 1000 CE
| After killing Surapadman at Tiruchendur, Lord Murugan killed the rest of the asuras here, at Tirupporur (literally, 'place of the sacred war')
|-
|7a
|Sri Subramaniya Swamy Temple
|Kumara Vayalur
|Tiruchirappalli
|1200 years
|Lord Muruga blessed the saint-poet Arunagiri Nāthar at Vayalur by writing OM in his tongue and initiated him to compose Tiruppugal. Arunagirināthar wrote 18 verses (910-927) on Vayalur in the Tiruppukal. Lord Natarajar is in the Sadura Danda pose in this Temple.
|-bgcolor=#eeeeee
| 8
| Shanmuganathan Temple
| Aarumaga Swamy
| Viralimalai (Tiruchirappalli)
|  - 
| Sage Vasishtar and his wife Arundhathi pray Lord Murugan here to ward off their curses. The temple is also known for its peacocks.
|-bgcolor=#eeeeee
| 9
| Mayilam Murugan Temple
| Aarumaga Swamy.
| Mayilam (Villupuram)
|  - 
| At the end of Surasamharam, one half of Surapadman assumed the form of the peacock here.
|-bgcolor=#eeeeee
| 10
| Pazhani Aandavar Temple
| Pazhani Andavar
| Vadapalani, Chennai
| 1875 CE
| One of the temples built in the modern era, this temple had extensive patronage from the renowned devotee of Lord Murugan Arulmigu Kribanandha Variyar..
|-bgcolor=#eeeeee
| 11
| Sri Vetri Velayudhaswami Temple
| Kaithamalai
| Uttukuli
| Not Known but Reconstructed in 1999
| Vetri Velyadhaswami appeared in front the great Tamil saint Agastiyar and helped him to perform his pooja Agastiyar.
|-bgcolor=#eeeeee
| 12
| Thindal Murugan Temple
| Thindalmalai
| Erode
| 
| Velyadhaswami temple is a model of Birla Mandir, with Golden Temple Car.
|-bgcolor=#eeeeee
| 13
| Arulmigu Subramanyaswamy Thirukovil
| Sivanmalai, Kangayam,
| Tirupur
| -
|One of the well known myths associated with Siva is his conquest of Tripuram – the three celestial cities which the Asuras (demons) had taken over, and wreaked havoc over them. The Devas (celestial gods) appealed to Siva for help and asked him to save them from the demons. Siva made mount Meru his bow, and Vasuki the serpent his bow-string and prepared to wage war against the Asuras. 
|-bgcolor=#eeeeee
| 14
| Arulmigu Balamurugan Temple
| Pachaimalai
| Gobichettipalayam
| 
| One of the two hill temples for Lord Muruga in Gobi, the other one being Pavazhamalai which is only 2 km away from Pachaimalai. Though this temple is very old, the structure has been built starting 1967.
|-bgcolor=#eeeeee
| 15
| Muthu Kumaraswamy Temple
| Pavalamalai
| Gobichettipalayam
| 
| The second hill temple for Lord Muruga in Gobi. 
|-bgcolor=#eeeeee
| 16
| Siragiri Dandayudhapani
| Chennimalai
| Erode
| 
| This hill is also called Sigaragiri, Pushpagiri and Siragiri and is located between Kangeyam and Perundurai. It is one of the better known temples of Lord Muruga in Coimbatore district where Lord Arunagirinathar was blessed with "Padikasu", wealth of coins. This is where a miracle took place in the year 1984 on 12 February. On that eventful day two bullocks of their own accord pulled a bullock cart up the 1320 steps. Saravana Munivar wrote the most popular Chennimalai Sthalapuranam 700 years ago. Milk and curds are used as special offerings to Lord Muruga in Chennimalai and it is the general belief that curds do not become sour here.
|-bgcolor=#eeeeee
| 17
| Velayudhasamy Thirukoil
| Pugazhi malai
| Karur
| 2000CE
| The temple is located on a hillock. This place is called Aarunattar malai which is considered as one of the oldest Hill rock of the south.
|-bgcolor=#eeeeee
| 18
| Bala Subramaniya Murugan Temple
| Vennai malai
| Karur
| 1800CE
| The temple was worshiped by Lord Bramma and Kamadhenu. This ancient temple dedicated to Muruga has the distinction of being visited by the Saiva saint Arunagirinathar once.  This hill temple enshrines the images of Murugan. 
|-
|19
|Arulmigu Balamurugan Temple
|Rathnagiri
|Thirumanikundram, Vellore
|1500CE
|Rathinagiri Bala Murugan Temple was built around the 14th century. Over the passage of time an ordinary sand structure was converted into a stone shrine.

The 14th Century poet Arunagirinathar has sung about this temple as ''Rathinakiri Vazh Murukane Ilaya Vaaramarar Perumaley, which means 'Murugan, the God of Devas resides in Rathinagiri'
|-
|20
|Rajendra Chozheewarar Temple
|Balasubramaniyan
|Periyakulam, Theni
| -
|
|-
|21
|Sri Kolanjiappar Temple
|
|Manavalanallur 2 km from Vriddhachalam
|1000 years old
|The benevolent Lord Siva so as to liberate the entire living being has incarnated himself in many holy Shrines in the so-called Middle Country. (Nadu Naadu). Vriddhachalam (means age old holy hill) is the best among such holy shrines. Two Mile west of this, there is a small village namely Manavalanallur. Where there is abundance of flowery trees bristling with humming of birds and insects.  It is known as Manavalanallur because Lord Skantha, the Manavalan (Eternal Bridegroom) has embodied himself here. In the words of Arunagirinathar.  "He is the Manavalan residing in the monkeys inhabited hill"
|-
|22
|Uthanda Velayudhaswamy temple, Uthiyur
|Velayudhasamy
|Uthiyur Hills,
Kangeyam, Tiruppur district
|9th century CE 
|Uthanda Velayudhasamy Temple is the main shrine dedicated to lord murugan after a flight of 100 steps in Uthiyur hills from the ground. It built in dravidian architecture with a huge water-well as well and the little path with few rocky steps beside the temple lead to the base of a hillock and the steps ended there as well. In this shrine, Velayudhaswamy appears with his spear and Peacock. There are many sculptures here and also some ancient era hero-stones.
|}
|23
|Balasubramaniyar Temple, Siruvaapuri
|Balasubramaniyar
|Chinnambedu, Siruvaapuri,
[[Tiruvallur District], 
|14th century CE 
|Siruvaapuri is connected to the epic Ramayanam and is the place where the sons' of Lord Rama, Lavan and Kusan lived.   Since they fought with Lord Rama here it is called "Siruvar Por Puri", which latter became "Siruvaapuri". However, the village is now called as Chinnambedu. Arunagirinathar the Tamil Saint of 14th century CE has visited this temple and has composed Tiruppugazh songs on the Murugan in this temple. He is standing facing the lord. The special feature of this temple is the presence of emarald peacock. The village is located 40 km from Chennai and can be reached by a detour before reaching Puduvoyal near Kavarapettai, before Gummidipoondi in Chennai - Kolkatta NH. 

 Temples of Lord Shiva 

Perur Pateeswarar Temple, Coimbatore
Sarva Sitheshwarar Shiva temple, Madipakkam,Chennai
 Agatheeshwarar temple, Ponneri, Thiruvallur Dist.
 Thirumaleeswarar Temple, Thirumathalampakkam, Arakonam Tk, Vellore Dt.
Lord Shivan temple, Thiru kundachappai village, Ooty, The Nilgiris Dt.
Chenchadainathar Karunakadakshi Temple, Thirumal Ugandan kotai ( TM Kotai ), Ramanathapuram dist, Tamil Nadu, India
 Arulmigu Amarasundreashwarar Temple, Singalandapuram, Thuraiyur taluk, Tiruchirappalli district 
 Surayanarayanar Temple, Gnairu, Redhills, Chennai
 Madurai Meenakshi Sundareswarar Temple, Madurai
 Nellaiappar Temple, Tirunelveli
Kasivisavanathar Gnanaambaigai Temple, Uthamapalayam
 Sankaranayinarkoil or Sankaranaraya swamy temple, Sankarankovil
 Brihadeeswarar Temple at Thanjavur
 Vaitheeshwaran Temple near Mayuram
 Jalakandeswarar Temple, inside the Vellore Fort, Vellore
 Kapaleeshwarar Temple at Mylapore, Chennai
 Dandeeswarar Koil, Velachery, Chennai
 Ramanathaswamy Temple at Rameshwaram
 Jambukeswarar Temple, Thiruvanaikaval at Tirucharapalli
 Arunachaleshwarar Temple at Thiruvannamalai
 Thillai Nataraja Temple at Chidambaram
 Vedapureeswarar Temple at Pondicherry
 Thyagaraja Temple at Thiruvarur
 Ekambaranathar Temple(Kachi Egambam) at Kancheepuram
 Thirumagaraleeswarar Temple at Kancheepuram
Kailasanathar Temple, Kanchipuram
Karchapeswarar Temple, Kanchipuram
 Vazhakarutheeswarar Temple, Kanchipuram
Sathyanatheswarar Temple ( Kachi Nerikkaaraikkadu), Kanchipuram
Metraleeswar Temple(Kachi Metrali), Kanchipuram
Iravatanesvara Temple, Kanchipuram
Muktheeswarar Temple, Kanchipuram
Ona Kantheeswarar Temple (Onakanthan Thali)
Anekadhangavadeswarar Temple (Kachi Anekatangapadam)
 Kalyana Pasupatheeswarar Temple (Thiru Aanilai), Karur
 Kalyanasundareswarar Temple, Thirumanancheri, Mayiladuthurai
 Magudeeswarar Temple, Kodumudi, Erode
 Virdhgiriswarar Temple at Vriddhachalam
 Sree Pasupatheeswarar Temple,  Pandanainallur
 Denupuriswarar Temple at Pattiswaram, Kumbakonam
 Nageeswarar Temple, Kumbakonam
 Amarapaneeswarar Temple at Pariyur, Gobichettipalayam
 Arudra Kabaleeswarar Temple at Erode
 Vigirtheeswarar Temple, Venjamangudalur, Karur
 Rathinagireeshwarar Temple, Iyermalai, Karur
 Sangameswarar Temple at Bhavani
 Natadreeswarar Temple inside Cauvery, Erode
 Emaneswarar Temple, Emaneswaram at Paramakudi.
 Agneeswarar Koil, Thirukkaattuppalli
 Brahmapureeswarar Koil, Sirkaazhi
 Thaayumaanavar Koil, Thiruchy
 Poongundra Nathar Temple, Mahibalanpatti (sivagangai) 
 Veerattaaneswarar Koil, Korukkai
 Koenaeswarar Koil, Kudavaasal
 Seshapureeswarar Koil, Thiruppaamburam
 Ligusaranyeswarar Koil, Ponnur
 Amirthakalasanaathar Koil, Sakkottai
 Hayavandheeswarar Koil, Seeyaaththamangai
 Maanikkavannar Koil, Thirumarugal
 Sookshmapureeswarar Koil, Sirukudi
 Uthraapatheeswarar Koil, Thiruchchengaattaangudi
 Panchanadheeswarar Koil, Thiruvaiyaru
 Pasupatheeswarar Koil, Aavoor
 Kasi Vishwanathar Temple, Darapuram
 Thiruaavinankudi Temple, Palani
 Agastheeswarar Koil, Agasthiyampalli
 AmudhaGataeswarar Koil, Kodikkarai
 Suguvaneshwarar Temple, Salem
 Kailashnathar Temple, Tharamangalam, Salem
 Theerthagirieswarar Temple, Theerthamalai, Dharmapuri
 Chandrasoodeshwarar Temple, Hosur
 Sri Ramalinga Sowdambikai Amman Temple at Raja street, Coimbatore.
 Sri Manneaswarar Kovil, Annur, Coimbatore
 Old Someaswarar Kovil at Annaimalai, Pollachi.
 Shree Sadhasiva Bhrameendhraal Temple, Nerur, Karur
 Sivapurishwarar Temple, Shivayam, Karur
 Brahmapureeswarar Temple, Thirupattur, Tiruchirappalli
 Sangameswarar Temple, Bhavani, Erode
 Kadambavananathar Temple, Kulithalai, Karur
 Ardhanaareeswarar Temple, Tiruchengodu, Namakkal
 Arapaleeswarar Temple, Kolli Hills, Namakkal
 Viratteeswarar Temple, Pillur, Namakkal
 Lingeshwarar Temple, Avinashi, Tiruppur
 Arulmigu Vedapurishwarar Temple, Thiruvothur, CHEYYAR.
 Ekambareswarar Temple, Chettikulam, Perambalur Dt, Tamil Nadu
 Sri Sivashankara Kasiviswanather Temple at Sri Chinna Mariamman Temple Kodaikanal.
 Arulmigu Vedhagiriswarar Temple, Thirukalukundram
 Kondarangi Hills - Lord Malligarjuna Swamy Temple, Konrangi Keeranur, Oddanchatram
 Arulmigu Kulantahivelappar Temple, Oddanchatram
 Agatheeshwarar temple, Dharapuram, Tirupur(https://web.archive.org/web/20160304220842/http://www.agastheeswarartemple.tinfo.in/)
 Arulmigu Sri Sivan Anaindha Pottri Temple, Mamsapuram, Srivilliputhur, Virudhunagar http://temple.dinamalar.com/en/new_en.php?id=2057
Arulmigu Brihadeeswarar and Mangalambigai temple in Kazhipattur, OMR
Vedaranyeswarar Temple, Vedaranyam, Nagapattinam Dt.

 See also 
 Panchabhootha Sthalangal
 Pancha Sabha Sthalangal
 The Ashta Veeratta shrines
List of temples in Kanchipuram

Temples of Lord bhairavar
 Kala Bhairavar Temple, Aathisivan temple, Thandarampattu, Thiruvannamalai .
 Yoga Bhairavar Temple, Tiruppathur, Sivagangai Dt.
 Bhairavar Temple, Vairavan Patti, Karaikudi
 Bhairava Moorthi ( Bhairava Natha Moorthi) Temple, Morepalayam, Tiruchengodu
 Bhairaveswarar Temple, Cholapuram, Kumbakonam
 Kalabhairav Temple, Adhiyaman Kottai
 Kala Bhairavar Temple, Achangulam, Pasuvanthanai Taluk
 Sri Bhairavanathaswamy Temple, Thagattur
 Sri kaala bhairavar Temple (Vairavankoil) near Eachangudi Thanjavur Dt
 Astha Bairavar Temple, Aragalur, Attur Tk, Salem Dt.
 Shri Bairavar Rudhra Alayam, Ecchankarunai, Chengalpatu -603003
 Kala Bhairavar Temple, Kshetra Balapuram, Near Mayiladuthurai, Tanjore Dt
Kala Bhairavar Temple, Kundadam, Tiruppur district
Bhairavar Temple, Renganathapuram, Bodinayakkanur, Theni dt

 Temples of Lord Thirumal 
Sri Srinivaasa Perumal, Thirumaleeswarar Temple, Arakonam
 Sri Lakshmi Narayanan Kovil, Sathyamangalam
 Kalyana Ramaswamy temple Tangrakottai
 Pulikundram Sri Lakshmi Narayana Temple, Pulikkundram, Mahabalipuram, Tirukalukundram
 Sri Sowmia Narayana Perumal Temple, Thirukostiur(sivagangai)
 Veera Ragava Perumal Kovil, Thandarampattu, Thiruvannamalai
 Ranganathaswamy Temple at Srirangam, Trichy
 Sri Varadaraja Perumal Temple Pondicherry
 Lakshmi Narasimha Swamy Temple, Vellore
 Yoga Narasimha Temple, Sholingur
 Narasimha Temple, Namakkal
 Varadharaja Perumal Temple, Saengalmalai, Karur
 Varadharaja Perumal Temple, Nainamalai
 Narasimha Temple at Tindivanam
 Yoga Narasimha Temple at Velachery, Chennai
 Uppiliappan Temple at Mayavaram
 Sri kadaladaitha adhi jeganatha perumal[Devi pattinam],Ramanathapuram 
 Chakrapani Temple at Kumbakonam
 Sarangapani Temple at Kumbakonam
 Ramaswamy Temple at Kumbakonam
 Oppliyappan Temple at Kumbakonam
Srinivasa perumal Temple, natchiyarkoil Kumbakonam
 Saranathan Temple at Tirucherai, Kumbakonam
 Adi Narayana Perumal Temple, Pariyur, Gobichettipalayam
 Kalyana venkatramanaswamy Temple, Thannthondri Malai, Karur
 Shree Abayapradhana Ranganathar Temple, Karur
 Vasantha perumal Temple, Kadavur, Karur
 Neelameegha perumal Temple, Kulithalai, Karur
 Kripasamudra Perumal (Arulmakadal) Temple at Mayavaram
 Thanjai Mamani Koil, Thanjavur
 Parimala Rangantha Temple at Mayavaram
 Ugra Narasimha Temple at Singaperumal Koil
 Ari Katha Rama Temple at Maduranthakam, Chennai
 Santana Srinivasa Temple at Mogappair
 Hayagreeva Temple at Chettipunyam, Chennai
 Hayagreeva Temple at Cuddalore, Chennai
 Varaha Temple (Nithya kalyana Perumal) at Tiruvidanthai, Chennai
 Varaha Temple (Bhoovaraha) at Simushnam
 Varadaraja Perumal Temple at Kancheepuram
 The Parthasarathy Temple at Chennai
 Ranganatha Perumal Temple at Erode Fort
 Magudeswarar Temple, Kodumudi, Erode
 Kongu Tirupati at Erode
 Sri Viswaroopha Lakshmi Nrusimha Temple at Kattavakkam, Kancheepuram District, Near Thenneri 
 The LakshmiNarasimhar Temple at Tindivanam
 The Lakshmi Narayan Temple at Pulikkundram near Thirukazhukundram
 The Kesavaperumal Temple at Chennai
 The Lakshmi Narasimhar Temple at Chennai
 The Madhavaperumal Temple at Chennai
 The Azhagar Temple, Alagar Kovil, Madurai
 The Koodalazhagar Temple, Madurai
 The Devaraja Swami Temple at Cuddalore
 Sri Mayakoothar Devasthanams, Perungulam, Tuticorin [Thoothukudi]
 Kottai Alagiri Nathar Temple, Salem
 Pandurangan Temple, Shevapet, Salem
 Arulmegu sattur perumal swamy temple, Solavampalayam, Kinathukadavu, Pollachi, Coimbatore
 Sri Rajagopalan Temple, Mannargudi
 Sri Kailasanathar Temple - kodaganallur
 Sri Adivaraha Temple Kallidaikurichi Tamlinadu
 Srivilliputhur Andal Temple, Srivilliputhur
 Sri Veeraragava perumal Temple, Dharapuram, Tirupur
 Arulmigu Sridevi Poodevi Sametha Aathinarayanan Temple, Mamsapuram, Srivilliputhur, Virudhunagar
Ashtabujakaram - Sri Adhikesava Perumal Temple, Kanchipuram
Tiruvekkaa - Sri Yathothkari Temple, Kanchipuram
Tiruvelukkai - Sri Azhagiya Singar Temple, Kanchipuram
Tirukalvanoor - Sri Adi Varaha Swami Temple, Kanchipuram
Tiruoorakam - Sri Ulagalantha Swami Temple, Kanchipuram
Tiruneeragam - Sri Jagadeeshwarar Temple, Kanchipuram
Tirukaaragam - Sri Karunagara Perumal Temple, Kanchipuram
Tirukaarvaanam - Sri Tirukaarvarnar Temple, Kanchipuram
Tiruparamechura Vinnagaram - Sri Vaikunda Perumal Temple, Kanchipuram
Tirupavalavannam - Sri Pavala Vanar Temple, Kanchipuram
Tirupaadagam - Sri Pandava Thoodar Temple, Kanchipuram
Tirunilaaththingalthundam - Sri Nilathingal Thundathan Perumal Temple, Kanchipuram
Tirupputkuzhi - Sri Vijaya Raghava Perumal Temple, Kanchipuram
 Temples of Lord Anjaneyar 

 Anjaneyar Temple, Namakkal- 18 feet single stone sculpture
 Sri Rama Bhaktha Anjaneyar Temple, Ayippettai, Chidamaram
 Anjaneyar Temple, Suchindram, Kanyakumari
 Anjaneyar Temple, Foothills of Nainamalai, Namakkal
 Sri Panchamukha Anjaneyar, Panchavatee, Pondicherry
 Sri Viswaroopa Adhivyadhihara Sri Bhaktha Anjaneya Swamy Temple, Nanganallur, Chennai
 Tirukkatikai Yoga Anjaneyar Temple, Sholingar
 Veera Anjaneya Swami Temple, Mylapore, Chennai
 Sri periya Anjaneyar Temple, Ambur
 Sri Sanjeevi Rayan Temple, Iyengar Kulam, Kanchipuram
 Sri Viswaroopa Panchamukha Anjaneya Swami Temple, Tiruvallur
 Sri Jaya Anjaneya Swami Temple, Karur
 Shri Bhaktha Anjaneyar, Vedasandur, Dindigul
 Sri PunithaPuli Anjaneyar Temple, Paramakudi
 Sri Anuvavi Anjaneya Temple, Coimbatore
 Arulmigu Kadu Hanumatharayar Temple, Dharapuram
 Arulmigu Nava Anjaneyar Temple, Madurai-Dindugul Bye pass, Kulasekarapattinam.
 Sree Moola Anjaneyar Koil, Thanjavur
 Sanjeevirayar Anjaneyar Koil pidampatti Village Mathur post Kulathur tk Puthukkottai dt. near by trichy.
Shri Rama Baktha Bavya Swaroopa Anjaneyar Temple, BHEL nagar, Medavakkam, Chennai
Panchamuga Anjaneyar Temple, Gowrivakkam, Chennai
Sri Guru Hanuman Temple, Vadavalli, Coimbatore

 Temples of Amman 
Adhiparasakthi Siddhar Peetam, Melmaruvathur, Kanchipuram
Koniamman Temple, Coimbatore
 Mariyamman Temple, Kuppuchipalayam, Paramathi Velur, Namakkal
 Angala Parameshwari Temple, Pillur, Namakkal
 Padaivetti Amman Temple, Pillur, Namakkal
 Arulmigu Maha Maariyamman temple, Thenkudi
Kamakshi Amman Temple, Kanchipuram
arulmigu sri seethala devi mahasakthi mariamman temple,perumpugalore,thiruvarur.
Gangai Amman Temple, Gudiyattam |Arulmigu Kodiyidai  Nayagi Temple, Thirumullaivoyal]]
Arulmigu Vanabathrakali Amman Temple, Mettupalayam, Coimbatore 
Adhi Kamakshi Temple, Kanchipuram
Kamakshi Amman Temple, Mangadu
Arulmigu Devi Pachaimalai Amman Temple, Thirumullaivoyal 
 Arulmigu Vaishnavi Devi Temple, Thirumullaivoyal 
 Mandhai Amman Temple, Rayavaram, Pudukkottai
kalingaiamman, Trichy Kuladevam Kalingaiamman Temple Beside Delta Kavery River Infront Sriranganathan Temple Srirangam
Arulmigu Shri Ayirathamman Kovil, Palayamkottai, Tirunelveli
 Shri Anandhavalli sametha Shri Agastheeswarar Temple, Semmangudi, Kudavasal taluk, Tiruvarur district, Tamil Nadu
 Arulmigu Chamundeshwari Amman Temple, Singalandapuram, Thuraiyur taluk, Tiruchirappalli district, Tamil Nadu
 Sri Angalaparameswari Amman Mel Kovil and Kizh Kovil, Kaveripattinam, Krishnagiri Dist. Tamil Nadu
 Shri Anandhavalli sametha Shri Agastheeswarar Temple, Semmangudi, Kudavasal taluk, Tiruvarur district, Tamil Nadu
 Arulmigu Mariamman Temple, Irukkankudi, Virudhunagar Dist, Tamil Nadu.
 Gomathi Amman Temple, Sankarankovil
 Aanangur Ammaicharamman (Mariamman) Temple, Aanangur, Before Pillur, Villupuram, Tamil Nadu.
 Arulmigu Angalaparameswari Aalayam, Chinna Subbarayapillai Street, Pondicherry-1.
 Bannari Mariamman Temple, Bannari, Sathyamangalam
 Chenchadainathar Karunakadakshi Amman Temple, Thirumal Ugandan kotai ( TM Kotai ), Ramanathapuram dist, Tamil Nadu, India
 Arulmigu Masani Amman Temple, Anaimalai (Pollachi)
 Pariyur Kondathu Kaliamman Temple, Gobichettipalayam
 Mariyamman temple, Samayapuram, Tiruchirappalli
Arulmigu Annai Sri Gowmariamman Temple, Veerapandi, theni Dist, Tamil Nadu.
 PunnaiNallur Mariamman Temple, Thanjavur
 Sholiyamman Temple, Karur
 Golden Temple, Sripuram Sri Laskshmi narayani Temple, vellore District Tamil Nadu
Arulmigu Gangai Amman Thirukkovil, Santhavasal, Tiruvannamalai District Tamil Nadu
 Arulmigu Devi Karumariamman Temple Thiruverkadu (Chennai)
 Bangaru Kaamaatchiyamman Koil, Thanjavur
 Arulmigu Kottai Mariamman Kovil, Salem
 Sri Ramalinga Sowdambikai Amman Kovil at Raja Street, Coimbatore.
 Kottai Mariamman Kovil, Dindigul
 Sri Poongundra Nayaki Amman Temple, MahibalanPatti(Sivagangai)
 Koppudayamman Koil, Karaikudi
 Kumariamman Koil, Kanyakumari
 Angalaparameswari Koil, Mel Malayanur
 Aathiparashakthi Koil, Mel Maruvathur
 Badrakali Amman Temple, madapuram, Sivagangai District.
Sree Bhadhrakali Devaswom,Kollencode(Kanniyakumari District)
Sri Rajarajeshwari Ishakkiamman Trust, Kollemcode (Kanyakumari)
 Mondaicaud Bhagavathi Temple, Mandaicaud (Kanyakumari)
 Muppandal Isakki amman Temple, Muppandal (Kanyakumari)
Arulmigu Thayamanagalam Muthu Mariamman Kovil, Thayamangalam, Sivagangai District
Arulmigu kannaparkula peecha vettuva gounder kuladeivam kulavilakkuammankovil, kaalamangalam 'erode ganapathi palayam, 
Arulmigu Mariyamman koil, Alangayam (Vellore)
Arulmigu Sri Chinna Mariamman Kovil (Kodaikanal) Dindugal District,
Arulmigu Sri Angalaparameswari Amman kovil, Pappakudi, Near Mukkudal, Tirunelveli Dist. Tamil Nadu
Arulmigu Sri Mariyamman kovil, திருப்பணிகரிசல்குளம் Thiruppanikarisalkulam, Near Pettai, Tirunelveli Dist, Tamil Nadu .
Muppidathi Amman kovil, திருப்பணிகரிசல்குளம் Thiruppanikarisalkulam''', Near Pettai, Tirunelveli Dist, Tamil Nadu .
 Arulmigu Sri Muttharamman Kovil, Ammandivilai, (Kanyakumari)
 Arulmigu Sri Manathattu Isakkiyamman kovil, Ammandivilai, (kanyakumari)  
 Arulmigu Sri Bhavani Amman thriukovil, Preiyapalayam
 Sri Santhanamari amman kovil vickramasingapuram, ambasamudram taluk tirunelveli

Ayyanarappan Temples
 Sri Porkilai, Sri Poorani Samedha Kaliyurayan Ayyanarappan Temple, Pillur, Villupuram, Tamil Nadu. 
 Sri Ayyanarappan Temple, Kanniakoil, Cuddalore Road, Puducherry.
 Ayyanarappan Temple, Kilputhupattu, Pondicherry.
 Arulmigu Ettimarathumuniappan Temple, Salem.
 Kathukonda Ayyanar Temple, Sundarapandiapuram, Tenkasi, Tamil Nadu
 Arulmigu Siraimeetta Ayyanar Temple, Kottaram, Aavinankudi, Cuddalore.
 Arulmigu Vaagaimarathu Ayyanarappan karuppusamy Temple, Magudanchavadi, Salem.
 Sri vaazl Munishwar Temple, Mannangadu,Thanjavur district.
 Navaladiyan Temple, Mohanur, Namakkal

Nagarajar Temples
 Sangabala Nagarajar Temple, Mohanur, Namakkal

SaibabaTemples
 Mukkan Saibaba Temple, Veeranampalayam, Namakkal
 Saibaba Temple, Thottipatti, Namakkal
 Saibaba temple, Mylapore, Chennai

Chitra Gupta Temples 
 Chitragupta temple, Kanchipuram
  Chitragupta temple, Chinnandipalayam, Tiruppur

Cave Temples of Pandiyas 
 Kandan Kudaivarai - Muruga Temple, Madurai- Period: Pandiya
 Seevaramudaiyar Kudaivarai - Shiva Temple, Pudukkottai- Period: Pandiya
 Pathinen Bhoomi Vinnagaram - Pazhiyili Iswaram - Naarthamalai, Pudukkottai - Period: Pandiya

Rockcut Monolith Temples of Pallavas

 Adyantha Kaamam - Dharmaraja Ratha, Mamallapuram - Period: Pallava

Structural Temples of Pallavas 
 Kailasanatha Temple - Kancheepuram Dt - Period: Pallava
Tiruparamechura Vinnagaram - Sri Vaikunda Perumal Temple- Kancheepuram Dt, Period: Pallava
Iravatanesvara Temple, Kanchipuram
 Raajasimmeswaram / Kshatriya Simmeswaram - Shore Temples, Mamallapuram - Period: Pallava
 Vijayalaya Choleeswaram - Naarthamalai, Pudukkottai - Period: Pallava
 Venkataramana Swamy Temple, Thanthondri malai, Karur - Period: Pallava
 Lakshmi Narashimma swamy Temple, Namakkal - Period: Pallava

Structural Temples of Vijayanagara 
 Kanagagiswarar Temple and Sri Periyanayagi Amman Temple- Devikapuram, Tiruvannamalai district - Period: Nayaka
 Sri Neelakanta Pillaiyar Temple-Peravurani, Thanjavur district

Structural Temples of Chola 

 Gangaikonda Cholapuram Temple[Jayankonda cholapuram]ARIYALUR - Period: Chola
 Raajarajeswaram - Peruvudaiyaar kovil or Big Temple, Thanjavur - Period: Chola
 Thayinum Nalla Iswaram - Aaragalur - Period: Chola
 Airavatheeshwarar Temple, Kumbakonam - Period: Chola

Temples of The Navagrahams

The Navagraham cluster at Kumbakonam

Other Navagraham Temples

Navagraha Temples of Chennai

Chennai has its own set of Navagraha Temples located in and around Kundrathur

a) Suryan      -  Agastheeswaram at Kolapakkam
b) Moon        -  Somanatheeswarar at Somamangalam
c) Mars        -  Vaitheeswaran at Poonamalee
d) Kethu       -  Neelakanteshwarar at Gerugambakkam
e) Guru        -  Ramanadeshwarar at Porur
f) Sukran      -  Velleswarar at Mangadu
g) Budhan      - Thirumeyneeswarar at Kovur
h) Rahu        -  Thirunageshwaram at Kundrathur
i) Saneeswarar - Agastheeswaram at Pozhichalur

For detailed write up on these temple refer to page on Kundrathur
Ayyanarappan Temples
Sri Porkilai, Sri Poorani Samedha Kaliyurayan Ayyanarappan Temple, Pillur, Villupuram, Tamil Nadu.
Sri Ayyanarappan Temple, Kanniakoil, Cuddalore Road, Puducherry.

References 

Temples
Tamil Nadu
Hindu temples
Tamil